The , nicknamed , represents Japan in international futsal competitions and is controlled by the Japan Football Association.

Japan is one of the two strongest futsal teams in Asia besides Iran, won the AFC Futsal Asian Cup in 2006, 2012, 2014 and 2022. It has also played in five FIFA Futsal World Cups.

Results and fixtures

Legend

2022

Fixtures & Results (futsal 2022), JFA.jp

2023

Fixtures & Results (futsal 2023), JFA.jp

Coaching staff

Current coaching staff

Manager history

(If statistics are unavailable, display former coaches in bulleted list form)

Players

Current squad
The following players were called up for the 2022 AFC Futsal Asian Cup tournament, held from 27 September to 8 October on Kuwait.

Previous squads
*Bold indicates winning squad

FIFA Futsal World Cup
1989 FIFA Futsal World Cup squad
2008 FIFA Futsal World Cup squad
2012 FIFA Futsal World Cup squad
2021 FIFA Futsal World Cup squad

AFC Futsal Asian Cup
2006 AFC Futsal Championship squad
2012 AFC Futsal Championship squad
2014 AFC Futsal Championship squad
2016 AFC Futsal Championship squad
2018 AFC Futsal Championship squad
2022 AFC Futsal Asian Cup squad

Competitive record

Summary

 *Denotes draws include knockout matches decided on penalty kicks.
 **Gold background color indicates that the tournament was won.
 ***Red border color indicates tournament was held on home soil.''

FIFA Futsal World Cup

AFC Futsal Asian Cup

Asian Indoor and Martial Arts Games

EAFF Futsal Championship

Grand Prix de Futsal

Futsal Confederations Cup

World ranking
There is currently no official futsal ranking.
, the top 5 AFC teams according to one Elo-based ranking system are:

See also

Japan
Men's
International footballers
National football team (Results (2020–present))
National under-23 football team
National under-20 football team
National under-17 football team
National futsal team
National under-20 futsal team
National beach soccer team
Women's
International footballers
National football team (Results)
National under-20 football team
National under-17 football team
National futsal team

References

External links
 Japan national futsal team – official website at JFA.jp
Japan national teams 2021 schedule at JFA.jp

Asian national futsal teams
Futsal
N